Carlos Thomas (born May 1, 1987) is a former Canadian football defensive back. He was signed by the San Francisco 49ers as an undrafted free agent in 2009. He played college football at South Carolina.

College career
Thomas finished his college career playing in 48 games, recording 60 tackles, 2.5 Tackles for loss, 12 Passes defended and 6 interceptions.

Professional career

San Francisco 49ers
After he went undrafted in the 2009 NFL Draft, he was signed by the San Francisco 49ers as an undrafted free agent. He was waived on August 30.

Saskatchewan Roughriders
On October 20, 2009, he was signed by the Saskatchewan Roughriders and placed on their Developmental Squad.

References

External links
Saskatchewan Roughriders bio 
South Carolina Gamecocks Bio

1987 births
Living people
American football cornerbacks
Canadian football defensive backs
American players of Canadian football
Edmonton Elks players
Hamilton Tiger-Cats players
Sportspeople from College Park, Georgia
Players of American football from Georgia (U.S. state)
San Francisco 49ers players
Saskatchewan Roughriders players
South Carolina Gamecocks football players